Jaume Cuadrat i Realp (1899 in l'Albagés – 1993 in Barcelona) was a Catalan writer in both Catalan and French languages.

He lost his mother when he was a child and he started publishing his writings thanks to his father's sister, Rosa. 

He trained to be a teacher in Lleida and he worked as a teacher before he went into exile in France after the Spanish Civil War, where he was a Spanish language teacher in Nice. He also collaborated with magazines such as Magisteri català.

Novels

La semence de liberté: ou la vie d'un Instituteur espagnol parmi la misère et le fanatisme des Maragatos, 1961
Les faux célibataires, 1962
Sacrifiée ou la guerre civile espagnole, 1965

References

1899 births
1993 deaths
People from Lleida
Writers from Catalonia
Spanish expatriates in France